Europiana is the seventh studio album by English singer-songwriter Jack Savoretti, released on 25 June 2021 through EMI; it is his first album recorded for this label after departure from BMG. It was preceded by the single "Who's Hurting Who", which was the only track on the album produced by Nile Rodgers and Mark Ralph. The album debuted atop the UK Albums Chart, becoming Savoretti's second number-one album in the country.

Commercial performance
Europiana debuted atop the UK Albums Chart dated 2 July 2021 with 21,000 chart sales, becoming Savoretti's second UK number-one album following his previous album, 2019's Singing to Strangers.

Track listing

Charts

Certifications

References

2021 albums
Jack Savoretti albums
EMI Records albums